Stefan "Steve" Hrymnak (March 3, 1926 – November 23, 2015) was a Canadian professional ice hockey player who played 18 regular season games in the National Hockey League for the Chicago Black Hawks and 2 playoff games for the Detroit Red Wings between 1951 and 1953. The rest of his career, which lasted from 1946 to 1965, was spent in the minor leagues.

Career statistics

Regular season and playoffs

References

External links

1926 births
2015 deaths
Canadian ice hockey defencemen
Canadian expatriate ice hockey players in the United States
Chicago Blackhawks players
Detroit Red Wings players
Edmonton Flyers (WHL) players
Ice hockey people from Ontario
New Westminster Royals (WHL) players
New York Rovers players
St. Louis Flyers players
Sportspeople from Thunder Bay